The Folk of Gloucester is a museum which is housed in two of the oldest buildings in the City of Gloucester, a Tudor merchant's house and a 17th-century town house. The museum, at 99–103 Westgate Street, is devoted to the social history of Gloucestershire.

Bishop Hooper is said to have lodged in the buildings now occupied by the museum the night before he was burned at the stake in front of St Mary de Lode Church in 1555.

The Museum was called Gloucester Folk Museum before rebranding itself in 2016. and then became Gloucester Life until it rebranded itself again in 2019.

Exhibits
Exhibits include:
Local crafts
Items relating to the River Severn fisheries
Historic costumes
A reconstructed Victorian classroom
A reconstruction of the pin factory that once operated on the premises
Displays relating to domestic life over the last 500 years

Selected publications
Taylor. Guide to the Collection of Bygone Agricultural Instruments. 1950.
Gloucester Folk Museum: A Guide to the Collections. 1963. (New edition, Chris Morris, 1986.)
Morris, Christopher I. Dairy Farming in Gloucestershire. 1983.

See also 
The Museum of Gloucester
List of museums in Gloucestershire

References

External links
Official website

Museums in Gloucester
Local museums in Gloucestershire
History of Gloucester
Westgate, Gloucester